Siege of Luoyang can refer to any of the following sieges of the Chinese city of Luoyang, which served as imperial capital to a number of Chinese dynasties:

 Siege of Luoyang (538), by Gao Huan
 Siege of Luoyang (613), by Yang Xuangan
 Siege of Luoyang (618), by Li Mi
 Siege of Luoyang (620–621), by Li Shimin
 Siege of Luoyang (1234), during the Mongol conquest of the Song dynasty

See also 
 Disaster of Yongjia